John Joseph Moloney (born 27 August 1949) is a former Ireland international rugby union player. He toured South Africa in 1974 with the British and Irish Lions and at the time played club rugby for St. Mary's College R.F.C.

References

1949 births
Living people
Irish rugby union players
Ireland international rugby union players
British & Irish Lions rugby union players from Ireland
St Mary's College RFC players